Dimorphotheca cuneata, commonly known as the rain flower or white bietou, is a plant species native to South Africa (Fynbos, Succulent Karoo, Nama Karoo, etc.). It is also widely grown as an ornamental and reportedly sparingly naturalized in Gila County in the US State of Arizona.

Dimorphotheca cuneata is a subshrub that, in its natural habitat, will grow to be 100 cm (40 inches) tall. Cultivated specimens may rmeasure 150 cm (60 inches). Leaves are long and narrow, with a few large teeth on the edges, giving off a strong scent when crushed. Wild flower heads have white ray florets and yellow disc florets, ,but this can vary in garden cultivars.

References

External links
photo of herbarium specimen at Missouri Botanical Garden

cuneata
Endemic flora of South Africa
Garden plants of Southern Africa
Plants described in 1800